João Scognamiglio Clá Dias (born São Paulo, 15 August 1939) is a Brazilian Roman Catholic priest and religious writer. He is the founder of the Heralds of the Gospel and was their Superior General until his resignation on 2 June 2017. He has been a member of the Marian Congregations, of the Third Carmelite Order, since 23 May 1956, and was ordained a Roman Catholic priest on 15 June 2004, aged 64 years old.

Early life and studies
Clá Dias is the son of a Spanish father, António Clá Díaz, born in Ceuta, and Annita Scognamiglio, born in São Paulo to Italian immigrants parents. He studied law at the Faculty of the Largo de São Francisco, in São Paulo. He has degrees in philosophy and theology at the Italian-Brazilian Universitarian Center, of São Paulo. He also is licentiated in Humanities by the Pontifícia Universidad Católica Madre y Maestra, of the Dominican Republic, a Master in Canon Law by the Pontifício Instituto de Direito Canônico of Rio de Janeiro, and a Doctorate in Canon Law by the Pontifical University of St. Thomas Aquinas, in Rome.

Heralds of the Gospel
He was member of the Tradition, Family and Property society, founded by Plinio Corrêa de Oliveira, of which he was a longtime collaborator and personal secretary. While the TFP itself was a reactionary political organization, Clá Dias was apparently not interested in politics, preferring that the TFP distance itself from politics and become a religious congregation inside the Catholic hierarchy. After his death in 1995, Clá Dias disputed and won legally TFP's ownership, in 2004. He decided to replace it with the Heralds of the Gospel, already created on 21 September 1999 and recognized on 22 February 2001 as an International Association of Pontifical Right by the Holy See. He was Superior General from their inception until his resignation on 2 June 2017, announced on 12 June 2017.

Works
He already published several books, including O Inédito sobre os Evangelhos (2013-2016), in 7 volumes, translated into English as New Insights on the Gospels, and his biography of Plinio Corrêa de Oliveira, O Dom de Sabedoria na Mente, Vida e Obra de Plinio Corrêa de Oliveira (2016), in 5 volumes.

References

External links
João Scognamiglio Clá Dias Biography (in english)

1939 births
Living people
20th-century Brazilian Roman Catholic priests
Brazilian religious writers
Founders of Catholic religious communities
Heralds of the Gospel
Brazilian people of Spanish descent
Brazilian people of Italian descent
21st-century Brazilian Roman Catholic priests
Tradition, Family, Property